Satyabhakta (Hindi: सत्यभक्त) (2 April 1897 – 3 December 1985) who used the mononym, was one of the founders of the Communist Party of India December 25-28, 1925 at Kanpur (then spelled Cawnpore).

Biography

Early life
Satyabhakta’s original name
was Chakhan Lal. He was born in Bharatpur district of Rajasthan, on 2 April 1897. His father Kundanlal was the principal of the Middle School run by the princely state.

He subscribed to 'Bharat Mitra' of Calcutta, which deeply influenced Satyabhakta. Satyabhakta came from a humble background and never accumulated wealth or property. He grew up reading revolutionary papers, and learnt about Khudiram Bose, Barindra Ghosh and Aurobindo Ghosh. He was also introduced to the weekly 'Satya Sanatan Dharma'.

He married a Dalit woman, who probably was a widow.

He came under the influence of Ganesh Shankar Vidyarthi and his 'Pratap'. He joined the underground revolutionary movement at a young age in 1912-13, collecting explosives making bombs. He did some senseless experiments in explosives and one severed his finger. Consequently, he was under police watch for the next twenty years. He appreciated Sakharam Ganesh Deuskar's 'Desher Katha', 'Anand Math' of Bankimchandra and 'Japan ka Uday'.

Becoming a Gandhian

In 1916, he became a volunteer of Bharat Sevak Samaj in Haridwar Kumbh and got an opportunity to meet Gandhiji. At that time, Sabarmati Ashram had not yet come into being. Its nucleus was functioning from a village one mile away from Alice Bridge, Ahmedabad, from a hired house. Satyabhakta went there and started doing the menial jobs like filling water, running flour hand-mill, etc., learning Bangla and Gujarati languages also at the same time. There he translated Gandhiji’s ‘Sarvodaya’ and ‘Jail ke Anubhav into Hindi. He came in contact with Gandhians like Kaka Kalelkar, Vinoba Bhave, Mahadev Desai and others. Gandhiji wanted him to stay in the Ashram permanently but Satyabhakta had his own ideas and did not fully agree with the concept of Ahimsa etc. Staying there from 1918 to 1920, he attended Bombay session of the Congress. He began to write from 1916, his first article being life of Dhondo Keshav Karve, then several biographies, articles in nationalist papers such as Saraswati, Maryada, Hitkarini, Pratibha and others. He worked in Bhavishya of Pt Sundarlal, coming in contact with leaders like Jawaharlal Nehru, Vijaya Lakshmi Pandit, others.

In contact with Communism

While working in ‘Maryada’ of Krishna Kant Malaviya, Satyabhakta joined non-cooperation movement in 1921. But soon getting disillusioned with Congress politics, he joined Rajasthan Seva Sangh. Then he came in contact with communist views and began to read about and appreciate Russian revolution. Satyabhakta corresponded with Sylvia Pankhurst, editor of Workers’ Dreadnought, organ of Communist Party of Great Britain. Through her, he got lot of Marxist literature. At the beginning of 1923, he joined Radha Mohan Gokulji in his left-wing weekly called ‘Pranveer’ from Nagpur.

He edited it for eight months and brought out its Independence Day Special. He also attracted attention as a correspondent on writing about S. A. Dange. Towards 1923-end, Satyabhakta returned to Kanpur and took part in workers’ activities. There was a strike at the beginning of 1924 of workers of Victoria Cotton Mills, lasting for one and half months. Satyabhakta in a letter in DainikVartman of 31 April 1924, provided details of the strike. He wrote that Mazdoor Sabha had collected two thousand rupees. He further wrote: "…there may be people in the Kanpur labor movement who believe in Communist or Bolshevik theories…". British government raised bogey of Bolshevism to cover up its anti-Communist acts such as Kanpur Bolshevik Conspiracy Case, he said.

Idea of formation of CPI
He began to think in terms of forming Communist party and convening an all India conference of Communists. Of course, many others in India, including Bombay Group, were thinking along similar lines. He announced intention to set up ‘Indian Communist Party’ in the Hindi daily Aj of 12 July 1924. He referred to Russia and to the Communist rule there, asserting that Communism was the only path uplifting unhappy and exploited people. He called upon all wage earners, peasants, workers, clerks, school masters, railway and postal employees, peons etc. to join the party. He signed the letter as secretary of ‘Bhartiya Samyawadi Dal’. His announcement appeared in English daily ‘Indian World’. In September 1925, Satyabhakta published two 4-page leaflets, in Hindi and English, titled ‘Indian Communist Party’, with a membership form printed at the end. The objects of Communist Party were defined as "establishment of complete swarajya and society based upon common ownership… of means and instruments of production and distribution…" He called for the abolition of zamindari system. He stated that the toiling people must organize themselves. The party will work to change the present system. Government of United Provinces banned both these pamphlets by a notification in the gazette of 11 October 1924. Satyabhakta protested against it through a letter to ‘Vartman’ (Kanpur) of 20 October 1924: "It is cowardice of the government to ban the rules of the party without declaring the party itself illegal." He was a Communist, and would face all the consequences. In Aj of 5 November 1924, he reiterated, "We have the right to organize a communist party." He said that the Congress had not defined swaraj, changes in social order have not been clarified, and the National Congress was strongly under the influence of rich people. Communists wanted to eliminate the difference between the rich and the poor. He quoted Lenin on this question. British government closely watched his activities, raided his house and his Socialist Bookshop several times and confiscated publications. His name was originally included among 13 people selected for Kanpur Conspiracy Case, but was dropped for want of evidence.

‘Pranveer’ published the ‘first quarterly report’ of ‘Indian Communist Party’ in a brief letter signed by Satyabhakta as secretary. He mentioned that party had 78 members by that time, mostly in Kanpur, and Madhya Pradesh and Rajasthan. Prominent members were: Maulana Hasrat Mohani, Narayan Prasad Arora (MLC), Rama Shankar Awasthi (Editor, Vartman), Radha Mohan Gokulji, Ram Gopal Vidyalankar (Editor, Pranveer), etc. Satyabhakta was in contact with the revolutionary organization HSRA, though not agreeing with everything. In the raid on his office, police seized copies of ‘Volunteer’ and ‘Revolutionary’, organs of HRA in UP. In October 1924, Satyabhakta wrote a 16- page pamphlet ‘Bolshevism Kya Hai’ (What is Bolshevism) in question-answer form. Mukut Bihari, editor of Swadesh, was arrested in Gorakhpur while selling this pamphlet. Satyabhakta strongly protested. Mukut Bihari was released in March 1925. A second ‘quarterly report’ of Indian Communist Party was published in March 1925, which claimed a membership of 215, including 139 from UP. The same month, Saklatvala, British Communist MP, communicated with Satyabhakta. A leaflet issued by Satyabhakta (18 June 1925) titled ‘The Future Program of Indian Communist Party’, mentioned for the first time that an Indian Communist conference would be held at the same time as Congress session in Kanpur at 1925-end. Police again raided his bookshop on 7 July 1925 and seized communist literature of CPGB. Hindustan Times of 16 July 1925 reported with the heading ‘Communist Party: police raid uncalled for, secretary explains’. Satyabhakta commented that India has been reduced to the level of a prison. The police and the British intelligence suspected that the Communist Party set up at Kanpur by Satyabhakta was a direct result of Hindustan Republican Association, with himself as figurehead. In his documents, Satyabhakta tried to provide aims, objects and programs of Communist Party more clearly.

Response to Satyabhakta’s call
S. V. Ghate recorded that after Kanpur Conspiracy Case, the "’Socialist’ Group" of Bombay had considered formation of a party. In the meantime, they came across Satyabhakta’s announcement, and decided to join the Kanpur conference. JP Bagerhatta also decided to do the same. KN Joglekar records that he and the Bombay Group learned of it through VH Joshi, who was going to meet SA Dange in Kanpur Jail. He wrote: "We, the Bombay Group, gave support to the idea and decided to participate in as large a number as possible." Joglekar said that Satyabhakta was helpful to the defence committee in Kanpur Conspiracy Case. Muzaffar Ahmed wrote that Satyabhakta contacted him through letter in Almora requesting participation in Kanpur Communist conference. Muzaffar Ahmed reached Kanpur and found Ghate, Joglekar, Nimbkar etc present. The initiative of Satyabhakta and others met with a positive response not only from Bombay and Bengal but also from Punjab and Madras.

Thus, according to Ghate, the work of bringing together the Communist groups at Kanpur was done by Satyabhakta. Satyabhakta formed a committee and got help from Ganesh Shankar Vidyarthi and his paper ‘Pratap’. Vidyarthi was a leftist and helped the Communists.

As is well-known, Kanpur foundation conference of CPI was a grand success. The ‘Indian Communist Party’ of Satyabhakta was dissolved and a formal Communist Party of India was founded. Satyabhakta wrote that he did not feel any dissatisfaction about this.

Satyabhakta’s differences and departure
Satyabhakta was elected to the CEC (central executive committee) formed at Kanpur conference. But he soon developed differences, particularly on the question of internationalism, and resigned from CEC. Later he went out of the party, though remained a sympathetic nationalist. Actually, there had been certain divergence of views between him and CPI at Kanpur on the nature of party, which he himself had initiated. This led to his gradual divergence from Communist movement. In Satyabhakta’s perception, it should have been an ‘Indian Communist Party’ rather than Communist Party of India. It was not a question of just a name but of a whole approach. He said he was not opposed to the Communist International (Comintern) and favoured a friendly relation with it, but observed that the party should not be tied to it.

Satyabhakta published the first number of his 8-page Hindi fortnightly ‘Samyavadi’ on 1 January 1926 after the  conference. He wanted to publish it at the time of the conference but could not do so. It contained articles by Singaravelu, Maulana Azad Subhani and Radha Mohan Gokulji, besides articles on Russia and Lenin. Both its initial numbers were seized by the British police. His book ‘Agle SaatSaal’ (next seven years) was also banned and
seized.

He later on worked in various Hindi journals like ‘Chand’, ‘Pranveer’, etc but had to leave them. He gradually became a destitute. He joined a spiritual ashram in Mathura in 1941 and other places, but he continued writing. He wrote about hundred small biographies of prominent Indian and foreign historical figures. He also wrote the history of Indian freedom movement from 1857 to 1947. He joined ‘Akhand Jyoti Ashram’ but never participated in their daily prayers and ‘aarti’ etc. He continued to believe in his own interpretation of communism.

Even 46 years after the events, he made it clear that he had no quarrel with the workers of the CPI.

Death
Satyabhakta died on 3 December 1985 as a destitute in the Ashram, nearing the age of 90.

Writings
 साम्यवाद का संदेश (The message of Communism), 1934

References

1897 births
1985 deaths
Indian communists
Communist Party of India politicians from Rajasthan
Indian Marxist writers